This is a timeline of declarations of war during World War II.

A declaration of war is a formal act by which one nation goes to war against another. The declaration is usually the act of delivering a performative speech or the presentation of a signed document by an authorized party of a national government in order to create a state of war between two or more sovereign states.  The official international protocol for declaring war was defined in The Hague Peace Conference of 1907 (or Hague II).  For the diplomatic maneuvering behind these events, which led to hostilities between nations during World War II, see  Diplomatic history of World War II.

List of war declarations 
Below is a table showing the outbreak of wars between nations which occurred during World War II.  Indicated are the dates (during the immediate build-up to, or during the course of, World War II), from which a de facto state of war existed between nations.  The table shows both the "Initiator Nation(s)" and the nation at which the aggression was aimed, or "Targeted Nation(s)".  Events listed include those in which there were simple diplomatic breaking of relations that did not involve any physical attack, as well as those involving overt declarations or acts of aggression. In rare cases, war between two nations occurred twice, with an intermittent period of peace. The list here does not include peace treaties or periods of any armistice.

Key to type (fourth column):

A = Attack without prior, formal declaration of war;C = Declaration and/or attack without standard, formal procedure, sometimes preceded by a casus belli thus fait accompli;U = State of war arrived at through use of ultimatum; W = Formal declaration of war made.

Gallery

See also 
Diplomatic history of World War II
Allies of World War II
Axis powers: German Instrument of Surrender and Surrender of Japan

Notes

References

Works cited
 

 
declaration
Chronology of World War II
Modern history timelines